The Šumadija fairground is an exhibition area in the Šumadija district of Kragujevac, Serbia, featuring 3,500 m2 of covered indoor space. The fair was established on 9 May 2005 in Kragujevac. One of the fairs with most success was the Šumadija Beer Open which was organised for the first time on 6 June 2007.

External links 
 

Fairgrounds
Annual fairs
Economy of Kragujevac
2005 establishments in Serbia